Cofimvaba is a town in Chris Hani District Municipality in the Eastern Cape province of South Africa.

The village is  79 km east of Queenstown on the route to Butterworth, in Thembuland. Probably named after the nearby stream which, after rains, froths turbulently and resembles milk. The name is also said to be derived from cofa, ‘press’, mvaba, ‘milk-bag’ (of goat-skin), done to break lumps of sour milk. Another explanation is that the sound of the water gurgling over the rocks is reminiscent of the splashing of milk in the bag when shaken.

The village of Cofimvaba was probably established in 1877 when the magisterial seat for Thembuland, (which had originally been located at St Marks), was transferred to a more accessible location. Chris Hani was born in Cofimvaba.

There is a hospital in Cofimvaba called Cofimvaba Hospital. There are also two high schools in town, St. James High School and Cofimvaba High School.

Notable people
 

 Hani, Chris, former leader of the South African Communist Party and chief of staff of uMkhonto we Sizwe, the armed wing of the African National Congress (ANC)
 Maxwell Xolani Rani, professional African dancer and choreographer

References

Populated places in the Intsika Yethu Local Municipality